Netherlands competed at the 1984 Winter Paralympics in Innsbruck, Austria. The team included six athletes, five men and one woman. Competitors from Netherlands won 0 medals to finish 15th in the medal table.

Medalists
No medals are won during these Paralympic games.

Alpine skiing

 Wiel Bouten
 Karel Hanse

Cross-country skiing

 Tineke Hekman
 Jan Visser

Ice Sledge Speed Racing

 Willem Hofma
 Henk de Jong

See also
Netherlands at the Paralympics
Netherlands at the 1984 Winter Olympics

References

External links
International Paralympic Committee official website

Nations at the 1984 Winter Paralympics
1984
Summer Paralympics